Julien Toudic  (born 19 December 1985) is a French former professional footballer who played as a striker.

Career
Toudic moved to AC Ajaccio in August 2015.

In 2019, he was retired.

References

External links
 
 
 

1985 births
Living people
Footballers from Caen
Association football forwards
French footballers
Stade Malherbe Caen players
Stade de Reims players
RC Lens players
S.V. Zulte Waregem players
Stade Lavallois players
CA Bastia players
AC Ajaccio players
Red Star F.C. players
Ligue 1 players
Ligue 2 players
Championnat National players
French expatriate footballers
Expatriate footballers in Belgium